Sri Krishna Maya is a 1958 Indian Telugu-language Hindu mythological film, produced by K. B. Nagabhushanam under the Sri Raja Rajeswari Film Company banner and directed by C. S. Rao. It stars Akkineni Nageswara Rao and Jamuna, with music composed by T. V. Raju. The film is based on Varanasi Seetarama Sastry's Narada Samsaram (drama).

The film was dubbed as Tamil movie Naradar Kalyanam which was released in 1959. K. Devanarayanan and G. S. Manian wrote the dialogues. The music was composed by M. Ranga Rao while the lyrics were penned by Papanasam Sivan, Thanjai N. Ramaiah Dass, Kuyilan and K. Devanarayanan.

Plot 
The film begins at Sri Krishna Tulabharam i.e. weighing of Lord Krishna (Raghu Ramaiah) is completed and everyone praises Sage Narada (Akkineni Nageswara Rao) for his wit. Here Narada's ego boasts up to ten folds and says that he is the only savior in this universe. Lord Krishna observes it and decides to teach him a lesson. So, he takes his musical instrument Mahathi by which his knowledge is also removed and transforms it into a beautiful girl Maya (Jamuna) daughter of a tribal leader Rudrama Dora (A. V. Subba Rao). Narada loves & espouses her and the couple is blessed with 60 children. Now Narada understands how difficult to navigate the family life who goes into heavy debts and suffers out of poverty & hunger. To discard their problems Rudrama Dora & his wife Durgamma (Chhaya Devi) asks him to sacrifice an animal to their Goddess to which Narada refuses after spotting the deity in it. So, he proclaims that even his entire family burnt up in a fire he is not ready to do such sin. Unfortunately, his word comes true and his entire family has burnt away. Narada tries to rescue them but sadly a tree falls on him when Krishna & Satyabhama (Suryakala) arrive in the guise and consoles him. Immediately, the illusion occurred to Narada removes and realizes that it is a myth played by Lord Krishna to remove his conceit & pride to purify his soul. At last, Lord Krishna gives back his instrument and knowledge to him. Finally, the movie ends with Narada chanting on Lord Krishna.

Cast 
 Akkineni Nageswara Rao as Narada Maharshi
 Jamuna as Maya
 Rajanala as Indra
 Raghu Ramaiah as Lord Krishna
 Dr. Sivaramakrishnaiah as Peeraiah
 Chadalavada as Vasanthaka / Santha
 Vangara
 K. V. S. Sarma as Lord Brahma
 A. V. Subba Rao as Rudrama Dora
 Nalla Ram Murthy as Gunachari
 Suryakantam as Nalini / Nalli
 Chhaya Devi as Durgamma
 Malathi as Goddess Saraswati
 E. V. Saroja as Dancer
 Rita as Mohini
 Suryakala as Satyabhama

Soundtrack 

Music composed by T. V. Raju. Music released on Audio Company.

Remake
It was remade in Hindi as Narad Leela in 1972 starring Shahu Modak.

References

External links 
 - a song sung by Jikki from the Tamil version film

1958 films
1950s Telugu-language films
Hindu mythological films
Films directed by C. S. Rao
Films scored by T. V. Raju
Indian films based on plays
Films based on the Mahabharata
Telugu films remade in other languages